Administratively, Portugal is de jure unitary and decentralized state. Nonetheless, operationally, it is a highly centralized system with administrative divisions organized into three tiers. The State is organized under the principles of subsidiarity, local government autonomy, and democratic decentralization of the public service.

The government structure is based on the 1976 Constitution, adopted after the 1974 Carnation Revolution. In addition to defining the status of the autonomous regions Azores and Madeira (Articles 225-234), the Constitution specifically identifies the three tiers of government (Article 235-262): civil parishes (freguesias), municipalities (municípios) and administrative regions.

In addition, the Portuguese territory was redefined during European integration, under a system of statistical regions and subregions known as Nomenclature of Territorial Units for Statistics. These NUTS definitions, used for collecting statistical information, follow many of the country's border definitions. Although utilized by the Portuguese government, they do not have a legal status in law.

The current administrative divisions of Portugal, are the 18 Districts and the 2 Autonomous Regions.

Districts

There are 18 districts in continental Portugal:

The distribution of Portuguese districts is nominally homogeneous, although there are outliers (Beja for example is 4.6 times larger than the smallest district, Viana do Castelo).  But these divisions bely the inadequacies and disparities that exist within the country: the distribution of population and gross domestic product between territorial units is markedly different. The district of Beja, for example, represents approximately 11.5% of the area of Portugal, while Viana do Castelo is less than 2.5%. But, in comparison, Beja represents only 1.6% of the population of Portugal.

Portugal is primarily a seafaring nation, and traditionally human settlement has congregated along the coastline, so much so that the coastal districts, while being relatively small, were disproportionately larger by population. The six largest districts (with the exception of Santarém) are the six districts with the smallest populations and common character: a frontier with Spain. Of these interior districts, which represent 63.8% of the nation and have a population that is less than two million residents, is only marginally less than the population of the district of Lisbon.

The district system dates back to 25 April 1835, a creation of the Liberal government, and inspired by the French départements, with the objective to facilitate the action of government and permit access to the authorities.

The district is the most relevant and historically significant subdivision of the nation's territory; it serves as the basis for a series of administrative divisions, such as electoral constituencies or district football associations, as well as being a socially recognizable territorial division of the country.
In 1976, Portugal was divided into 18 districts and two autonomous regions (the Azores and Madeira), consisting of 308 municipalities, which in turn were divided into 4257 local government authorities.

Article 291 of the 1976 Constitution defined the districts as a transitional level of administration, awaiting the formation of the administrative regions. In the period between 2003 and 2013 the whole continental territory of Portugal was subdivided into metropolitan areas and intermunicipal communities, which rendered the districts obsolete. As a consequence of these constitutional revisions the "district" has been removed from the legal framework, but remains an important and relevant division for other entities. Similarly, it is still recognized by the general public.

Autonomous regions 

Since 1976, Portugal conceded political autonomy to its North Atlantic archipelagos (Madeira and Azores) due to their distance, isolation, geographical context and socio-economic circumstances. The regional autonomies have their own organic laws, regional governments and administration, overseen by a Regional Government, that constitutes a Regional Cabinet, comprising a President and several Regional Secretaries.

The Azores is an archipelago of nine islands and several islets that were discovered and settled by the Portuguese in the late 15th century. The Azores lies a third of the distance between Europe and North America, along the Mid-Atlantic Ridge. The government and administration of the archipelago is distributed between the three capitals of the former districts of the Azores: the regional parliament is located in the city of Horta (on Faial Island); Ponta Delgada (on São Miguel Island) is the most populous city and home to the Regional Presidency and administration; while Angra do Heroísmo (on Terceira Island), the historical and cultural capital, is the home of the Azorean judiciary and seat of the Diocese of the Azores.

Madeira is an archipelago that includes two principal islands, Madeira and Porto Santo, plus two uninhabited natural group of islands, the Desertas and Savage Islands. The archipelago is located closer to Africa than Europe, is highly commercial and urbanized; its regional capital (Funchal) is developmentally comparable to urban centers in the Canary or Balearic Islands.

Subdivisions 

The division of the Portuguese territory is established in title eight (Título VIII) of the Portuguese constitution: granting local authority to territorial collectivities with representative organs to affect the interests of the local populations. These collectivities are defined as autonomous regions, administrative regions, municipalities and civil parishes, but reserves the right of urban areas and islands to establish other forms of local authority. In defining the rights and privileges of these entities, the constitution also defines sources of income, that includes local heritage, budgets and equalization transfers from the State, in addition to defining the basic role of local government at each level.

Autonomous regions 

Since 1976, Portugal conceded political autonomy to its North Atlantic archipelagos (the Azores and Madeira) due to their distance, isolation, geographical context and socio-economic circumstances. The regional autonomies have their own organic laws, regional governments and administration, overseen by a Regional Government, that constitutes a Regional Cabinet, comprising a President and several Regional Secretaries. Their legislatures are designated Legislative Assembly.

Administrative regions 

A plan to divide mainland Portugal in eight regions was defeated in a referendum in 1998. The metropolitan areas of Lisbon and Porto were created in 1991. A law passed in 2003 supported the creation of more metropolitan areas, urban communities and other associations of municipalities, but a law passed in 2008 abolished these, converting them into intermunicipal communities. Finally in law 75/2013 September 2013 the current two types of administrative regions were defined:
metropolitan areas (áreas metropolitanas) and
intermunicipal communities (comunidades intermunicipais).

Metropolitan areas 

The Metropolitan Areas are territorial units formed by grouping municipalities, in order to economize on municipal investments and services. As of 2014, there are two metropolitan areas that correspond to Level III NUTS regions:
 The Lisbon metropolitan area (Área Metropolitana de Lisboa), consisting of 18 municipalities with a total population (2011 census) of 2,821,876
 The Porto metropolitan area (Área Metropolitana do Porto), consisting of 17 municipalities with a total population (2011 census) of 1,759,524

Intermunicipal communities 

The intermunicipal communities replaced the urban communities, the intermunicipal communities for general purposes and some metropolitan areas that were created in 2003, and abolished in 2008. The territories of the intermunicipal communities are (roughly) based on the NUTS III statistical regions. As of 2014, there are 21 intermunicipal communities:

 Alentejo Central
 Alentejo Litoral
 Algarve
 Alto Alentejo
 Alto Minho
 Alto Tâmega
 Ave
 Baixo Alentejo
 Beira Baixa
 Beiras e Serra da Estrela
 Cávado
 Douro
 Lezíria do Tejo
 Médio Tejo
 Oeste
 Região de Aveiro
 Região de Coimbra
 Região de Leiria
 Tâmega e Sousa
 Terras de Trás-os-Montes
 Viseu Dão Lafões

Municipalities 

Apart from the national territory, that includes mainland Portugal and the two archipelagos, the municipalities (municípios, colloquially known as concelhos) have been the most constant territorial subdivision in the past 900 years.  While a term for municipality appeared in the 13th century, to "express a community constituted in a territory of varying extensions, whose residents – the neighbours of the municipality – are granted major or minor administrative autonomy", the territorial division predates its use. Preceding the nation's independence, the oldest of the larger municipalities still in existence Coimbra and Santarém were founded in 1085 e 1095, respectively. São João da Pesqueira (in the district of Viseu) is the oldest Portuguese municipality, founded in 1055.

Since the creation of a democratic local administration, in 1976, the Portuguese municipalities have been ruled by a system composed by an executive body (the municipal chamber) and a deliberative body (the municipal assembly). The municipal chamber is the executive body, and is composed of a president of the municipality and a number of councillors whose number depends on the municipality's population. The municipal assembly is composed of the presidents of all the civil parishes plus a number of directly elected representatives that has to be at least equal to the number of civil parish presidents plus one, and which otherwise depends on the municipal population.

There are 308 municipalities in Portugal. They are usually named for their biggest city, or at least, their historically most important city or town. However, the municipality is usually much larger than the city or town after which it is named. The largest in area is Odemira with 1720.60 km², the smallest is São João da Madeira with an area of 7.94 km².

Nearly all municipalities are subdivided into civil parishes. Barcelos is the municipality with the largest number of civil parishes (61). There are six municipalities that have only one civil parish: São João da Madeira, Alpiarça, Barrancos, Castanheira de Pera, Porto Santo (Madeira) and São Brás de Alportel. The municipality of Corvo (comprising the Corvo Island in the Azores) is the only Portuguese municipality without a civil parish.

Civil parishes 

The parish, in contrast with the municipalities, had their base in the ecclesiastical divisions that "had its origin in the fact that neighbours professed the same religion and professed their faith and divinity in the same temple".  Between 1216 and 1223, Afonso II of Portugal began a process of legitimizing the Portuguese territory by conferring charters to nobles, clergy and municipal chambers (which would not be completed until after 1249 (under Afonso III of Portugal), making the parish the smallest division. From the 19th century freguesia began to refer to the civil/administrative entity, while the paróquia (Latin and 19th-century Portuguese: parochia) became affiliated with the religious entity.

Since the creation of a democratic local administration, in 1976, the Portuguese parishes have been ruled by a system composed by an executive body (the junta de freguesia, "parish board") and a deliberative body (the assembleia de freguesia, "parish assembly"). The members of the assembleia de freguesia are publicly elected every four years. The presidents of the parish boards are also members of the municipal assembly.

Before the 2013 local government reforms, the 308 municipalities were subdivided into 4,259 civil parishes. As part of the national government's attempt to control spending, in light of the sovereign debt crisis, in 2012 the government of Pedro Passos Coelho introduced a plan to reform the administrative divisions, in order to create efficiencies and save money. The plan envisioned the reform of the management, territorial geography and political form of how Portugal functioned at the local level, including specifically at the freguesia and município levels. In addition to the reduction of the number of representatives in the local boards, the plan also established criteria for the reduction, amalgamation or extinction of various civil parishes. The reform was implemented according to law 11-A/2013 January 2013, which defined the reorganization of the civil parishes,

Since the 2013 reform, there are 3,091 parishes in Portugal. The largest in area is Alcácer do Sal (Santa Maria do Castelo e Santiago) e Santa Susana with 888.35 km², the smallest is Borba (São Bartolomeu) with an area of 0.20 km².

Historical subdivisions 

Portugal has a complex administrative structure, a consequence of a millennium of various territorial divisions. Unlike other European countries like Spain or France, the Portuguese territory was settled early, and maintained with stability after the 13th century.

The first division of the Portuguese territory was based exclusively on the Roman Iberian provinces of Hispania Tarraconensis, Lusitania and Hispania Baetica, established by Emperor Augustus between 27-13 B.C. The actual territory of Portugal north of the Douro, the Province of Tarraconensis, occupied half of the peninsula, while the Province of Lusitania, included the area south of the Douro. These Roman provinces were themselves subdivided into conventus iuridicus: Conventus Bracarum, its seat in Bracara Augusta (today the city of Braga); Conventus Scallabitanus, its seat in Scallabis (today the city of Santarém); and Conventus Pacensis, its seat in Pax Julia (today Beja). By the end of the third century, Emperor Diocletian administratively reordered Tarraconesis, dividing it into three separate territories (Tarraconensis, Carthaginensis and Callaecia), the latter comprising the northern Portugal, Galicia and Asturias. These divisions remained constant even after the Visigoths controlled the Iberian peninsula.

During the period of Al-Andalus and Muslim caliphates, the Iberian peninsula was divided administratively into provinces (kuwar) and municipalities (kurar), along the lines of the Roman-Visigothic delineations. Meanwhile, the taifa of Badajoz dominated the spaces of Beiras, Estremadura and a great part of the Alentejo.

With the expansion of the Portuguese national territory, following the conquest of new lands, the monarchy imposed a structure that permitted permanent dominion and organization of territorial space. There was also a tendency to demarcate lands associated with settlements or seigneurial properties; there was a constant history of forals (the royal charters) being allocated for unorganized territories, as a means to primarily establish fealty rights and encourage medieval settlement. Historically, the institution of the foral system was a way to divide the territory and to establish local administrative control (and not regional or hierarchical continuity). Similarly the parish, instituted by the religious orders that dominated the country, controlled local ecclesiastical power at the local level.

During the reign of King Dinis (1279–1325), the monarch instituted a series of inquiries throughout the kingdom which resulted, a few years later, in the configuration of the territory into provinces and municipalities. This was the first official recognition of the diversity of the country, and in the King's Testamento do Reino de Portugal he recognized the five "regions" of the nation: Antre Douro e Minho; Antre Douro e Mondego; Beira, Estremadura and Antre Tejo e Odiana.

Provinces 

Dinis's successor, Afonso IV (1325–1357), instituted a system of six official comarcas, that reflected a concrete definition of these regions: Antre Douro e Minho, Antre Douro e Mondego, Beira, Estremadura, Antre Tejo e Odiana and Algarve. Between the reign of Afonso IV and the 20th century there were numerous alterations to the limits of the nation, a consequence of development and population growth. Further modifications to the limits of these provinces occurred in the Plano de Ordenamento da Mata Nacional da Machada (1864), the first scientific delimiting of forest resources, and the Projecto Geral da Arborização dos Areais Móveis de Portugal (1897), which modified land usage along the coast.

But, until 1832, the provinces did not serve an administrative function, although they did mark the differences in habits, linguistic peculiarities and socio-cultural characteristics.  The province remained a military designation, chiefed by the General das Armas (Military Governor), expressly forbidden from influencing municipal affairs. During the Liberal regime, some of the liberal politicians conceived an administrative system where provinces were the top level tier of government, maintaining their former names, but with different frontiers. The debate over the importance of provinces only arose from fears that there would be an excessive concentration of power in the hands of governmental officers. The adoption of the 17 districts (1835) instead of eight provinces was an attempt to dissolve such power.

In 1936, the provinces were reestablished as administrative divisions in Portugal. However, instead the six traditional provinces, 11 new ones were established: Minho, Douro Litoral, Trás-os-Montes e Alto Douro, Beira Alta, Beira Baixa, Beira Litoral, Estremadura, Ribatejo, Alto Alentejo, Baixo Alentejo and Algarve. These were based in the natural regions identified by the geographer Amorim Girão in several studies he published between 1922 and 1930. The Estado Novo regime used the provinces to characterize traditional and rural Portugal. Each province intended to be a regional community, to which were given decentralized powers. Yet, the Districts continued to define administrative and political control, much like the organization of public security for the State, limiting the powers of local government. This organizational structure for the territory resulted in a loss of the sense of regional identity, which was only kept alive by oral traditions, based on regional references of origin.

There was a substantial difference between the European provinces and regions and the overseas colonies (the so-called overseas provinces).

Following the Carnation Revolution, the regions and provinces were abolished and the districts became the second level administrative regions.

Overseas 

The term overseas province started to be used to designate each of the Portuguese overseas territories, instead of the previous overseas dominion, during the administrative reforms of the beginning of the 19th century, following the idea that these territories were as part of Portugal as the Portuguese European provinces. In the beginning of the 20th century, most of these territories started to be referred as colonies, although the term overseas provinces continued also to be used. Only after 1951, the term colony was completely dropped and the term overseas province was exalted by the government of António de Oliveira Salazar to shift the attention of anti-colonial protests in the United Nations. But the history of extra-local territories (colonies or provinces) within Portuguese administration dates back to the first settlements along the African coast, South-east Asia and Brazil, and were instituted as part of the 1832 reforms. The initiatives envisioned a comprehensive series of provinces that would have included European Portugal, archipelagos and extra-local dependencies in Southeast Asia, Africa and India. These colonies included:
 Portuguese West Africa: an overseas province between 1951 and 1975, when it became the independent nation of Angola;
 Cape Verde: an overseas province between 1951 and 1974, autonomous republic between 1974 and 1975, when it became an independent nation;
 Portuguese Guinea: an overseas province between 1951–1974, until unilaterally declaring independence as Guinea-Bissau in 1973 (later recognised by Portugal in 1974);
 Macau: overseas province between 1844 and 1883; included many of the overseas provinces of South-east Asia with Portuguese Timor in the administration of Goa, between 1883 and 1951); an overseas province between 1951 and 1975; special territory between 1975 and 1999, before being returned to China as a special administrative region in 1999;
 Portuguese East Africa: overseas province between 1951 and 1974); local administration between 1974 and 1975, before it became the independent nation of Mozambique;
 Portuguese India: an overseas province between 1946 and 1962, it was annexed by India in 1962 (and later recognised by Portugal in 1974);
 São Tomé and Príncipe: an overseas province between 1951 and 1971); local administration between 1971 and 1975, before it became an independent nation in 1975;
 Portuguese Timor: an overseas territory between 1951 and 1961, until unilaterally declaring independence as East Timor in 1975, it was annexed by Indonesia in 1976, recognised by UN as non-self-governing-territory under Portuguese administration between 1961–1999. After 1999 it was a United Nations protectorate until formal independence in 2002.
Initially the population of these overseas territories were made to exploit resources (minerals, spices, wood or slaves), but later there was a sense of evangelisation or lusotropolicalism, that facilitated the colonization of these lands. The first significant colony was Brazil whose history included a period as kingdom within the United Kingdom of Portugal, Brazil, and the Algarves (1815–1822), before a political schism would result in its independence in 1822.

NUTS 

The Eurostat-based NUTS system subdivides the nation into three levels: NUTS I, NUTS II and NUTS III. In some European partners, as is the case with Portugal, a complementary hierarchy, respectively LAU I and LAU II (posteriorly referred to as NUTS IV and NUTS V) is employed. The LAU, or Local Administrative Units, in the Portuguese context pertains to the 308 municipalities (LAU I) and 4257 civil parishes (LAU II) respectively. In the broadest sense, the NUTS hierarchy, while they may follow some of the  borders (municipal or parish) diverge in their delineation.

See also 
 Subdivisions of Portugal
 List of regions and sub-regions of Portugal
 List of municipalities of Portugal (LAU I)
 List of parishes of Portugal (LAU II)
 List of cities in Portugal
 List of towns in Portugal
 ISO 3166-2:PT

References 
Notes

Sources

External links 
Lisbon Metropolitan Area
Greater Porto
Madeira's Regional Government
Azores' Regional Government
CityMayors feature
Current and Former Colonies and Possessions of Portugal from WorldStatesmen.org

 01
 
Portugal
Portugal politics-related lists
Decentralization